The Yarraville Seddon Eagles Football Club is an Australian rules football club which has competed in the WRFL  since 2007.
They are based in the Melbourne suburb of Yarraville.

History
The "Kingsville Football Club" was a member of the FDFL from 1936. They wore a jumper that was similar to the Williamstown (VFL). They had a home ground in Roberts St, Yarraville before moving to the Yarraville Oval in 1990.

In 1996 The Kingsville Football Club changed its name to Yarraville. Kingsville had started playing at the Yarraville Oval several years earlier. The first game under the Yarraville name saw Yarraville lose to Parkside. However, after that Yarraville would win 15 out of 18 games in 1996 and take 1st place on the ladder. They made it to the Grand Final but would lose to Parkside. In 1997 Yarraville again took top spot and again took on Parkside in the Grand Final but this time were able to win the Flag. Yarraville's reserves team also won the grand final beating Parkside as well.

In 1998 Yarraville suffered after losing many of the players who had helped win the flags the previous year and would finish midway through the ladder. In 1999 Yarraville struggled and would only manage 4 wins for the season. They finished last and were relegated to the second division of the WRFL.

In 2000 Yarraville were able to rebuild and had probably the best team since the '97 grand final winning team. The club was determined to get back to division 1 where they felt they rightfully belonged. They won all but one game for the season and often won by margins of 20-30 goals. On 15 July Yarraville kicked 55 goals and 33 behinds against the struggling Brooklyn. 
Yarraville defeated Glenorden in the Grand final. The win put Yarraville back into 1st division for the following season.

From 2001 to 2006 Yarraville maintained its spot in 1st division and just missed out on playing finals several times.

During the 2006 season Yarraville began talks about a possible merger with the Seddon Football Club. Seddon had dropped out of the senior competition after 10 games due to poor performance. The merger was eventually agreed upon. The Yarraville Football Club played its final game at the end of the 2006 season when they defeated St Albans. Although this marked the end of the Yarraville Football Club, 2007 marked the beginning of the "Yarraville Seddon Eagles Football Club", a combination of the Yarraville FC, Seddon FC and Yarraville Juniors.

Premierships
Below there is a list of the premierships won by the Yarraville Seddon Eagles and its predecessors, Yarraville FC (previously named Kingsville FC) and Seddon FC. Seddon played in the FDFL from 1935 until its merger in 2006. It wore the jumper similar to 

 Western Region Football League
 Division One (8): 1943, 1964, 1997, 1950, 1953, 1976, 1991, 1992 
 Division Two (8): 1942, 1971, 1977, 2000,, 1998, 2001 , 2012, 2019

Notes

Bibliography
 History of the WRFL/FDFL by Kevin Hillier – 
 History of football in Melbourne's north west by John Stoward –

References

External links
Official Club Website

Australian rules football clubs in Melbourne
Australian rules football clubs established in 2006
2006 establishments in Australia
Western Region Football League clubs
Sport in the City of Maribyrnong